Kanab Creek Wilderness is a  wilderness area located along the Coconino/Mohave County line in the U.S. state of Arizona, approximately  south of Fredonia.   of the Wilderness are located in the North Kaibab Ranger District of the Kaibab National Forest, the remaining  are administered by the Arizona Bureau of Land Management.

One of the major tributaries of the Colorado River, Kanab Creek is the largest tributary canyon system on the north side of the Grand Canyon.

Evidence in Kanab Creek Wilderness indicates that this area was inhabited by prehistoric peoples up to approximately AD 1100.  The Wilderness contains some of the most interesting and significant rock art in the Southwest.

Vegetation
Kanab Creek Wilderness is dominated by desert shrub blackbush, with occasional clumps of Indian ricegrass or needle-and-thread grass in the lower elevations.  Along the drainage bottoms are groups of cottonwood, desert almond, western redbud, and single-leaf ash trees, though some of these riparian habitats are being invaded by salt cedar.  The upper reaches have some stands of pinyon pine and juniper, but sagebrush dominates most of the area.

Wildlife
The higher elevations of Kanab Creek Wilderness are used as winter range by mule deer and almost all of the chukar partridge in Arizona live in this area.  The area is home to bobcat, fox, coyote, and various small mammals such as rabbit, squirrel, and mice.  Several species of toad, frog, lizard, and snake can also be found in this area.  The only known venomous snake in the Wilderness is the rattlesnake.

Trails

Three trails lead into Kanab Creek Wilderness:
 Jumpup-Nail Trail or Trail #8 descends from Sowats Point, crosses Sowats Canyon, and descends into Jumpup Canyon where it joins Trail #41.
 Ranger Trail or Trail #41 descends into Jumpup Canyon for about four miles before exiting the canyon just above Lower Jumpup Spring. It then follows the general contour of a sandstone bench that encircles the Jumpup Point promontory before crossing Lawson, Dinner Pockets, and Big Cove Canyons and descends into Kanab Creek Canyon about 5 miles beyond Lawson. It ends in the canyon where it joins Trail #59.
 Snake Gulch-Kanab Creek Trail or Trail #59 joins the Ranger Trail in Kanab Creek Canyon about three miles downstream from the confluence with Snake Gulch. It then continues down the canyon but is not signed or maintained beyond that point.

See also
 List of U.S. Wilderness Areas
 List of Arizona Wilderness Areas
 Wilderness Act
 Kanab Creek Trail

References

External links
 
 Kanab Creek Wilderness Area – Kaibab National Forest
 Kanab Creek Wilderness Area – Bureau of Land Management
 Kanab Creek Wilderness Management Plan – Bureau of Land Management
 Kanab Creek Wilderness – Wilderness.net
 Kanab Creek – Todd's Desert Hiking Guide

Protected areas of Coconino County, Arizona
Protected areas of Mohave County, Arizona
Wilderness areas of Arizona
Kaibab National Forest
Bureau of Land Management areas in Arizona